Matheus Rodrigues Cézar da Silva (born 3 October 1996) is a Brazilian futsal player who plays for FC Barcelona and the Brazilian national futsal team as a winger.

References

External links
Liga Nacional de Futsal profile

1996 births
Living people
Brazilian men's futsal players
FC Barcelona Futsal players
Brazilian expatriate sportspeople in Spain